The Vogler is a hill range in the Central Uplands of Germany.

Vogler may also refer to:

Vogler (surname)
Vogler Peak, rock peak in Antarctica
Vogler Air Base, used by the Austrian Air Force